Ipomopsis aggregata is a species of biennial flowering plant in the phlox family (Polemoniaceae), commonly known as scarlet trumpet, scarlet gilia, or skyrocket because of its scarlet red flowers with lobes curving back as if blown back by rocketing through the air.

Description 
Ipomopsis aggregata has characteristic red, trumpet-shaped flowers and basal leaves stemming from a single erect stem. Depending on elevation, height can range from 12 inches, in Rocky Mountain alpine areas, to over 5 feet, in areas of southern Texas. Trumpet flowers can range from white, red, orange-red, and pink. Pink flowers are especially common in high mesa areas of Colorado, such as the Flat Tops, Grand Mesa, or the Uncompahgre Plateau. Yellow flowers have been reported for plant but are extremely rare. Fernlike leaves are low to the ground, helping encourage warmth in colder areas, and have silver specks and a fine white pubescence. A well known delicacy in nature, Ipomopsis aggregata is well adapted to herbivory, as it can regrow multiple flowering stalks once lost. Although herbivory initially reduces seed and fruit count of the plant, intermediate herbivory and its stimulating factors could lead to the plant growing larger over time. Elk and mule deer are common herbivores on Ipomopsis aggregata.

In its first year, the plant appears as a cluster of distinctive leaves, which collect energy into the taproot, from which it rapidly grows in its second year.

Synonyms 
Synonyms include:
 Cantua aggregata  Pursh 
 Gilia aggregata  (Pursh) Spreng.

Chemistry 
Patuletin glycosides can be found in I. aggregata as well as eupalitin and eupatolitin.

Taxonomy 
Since its discovery in 1814 by Frederick Pursch, the plant has undergone many name modifications. The current scientific name of "Ipomopsis", Latin for "similar to Ipomoea" or morning glories, refers to its similarities between the morning glories' similar red tubular flowers. "Aggregata", "brought together" in Latin refers to its petal growing pattern. Common names include scarlet gilia, scarlet trumpet, and skyrocket. The potent smell from glands within its basal leaf formations grant it the name skunk flower. In some areas it is also called honeysuckle, owing to the shape of the flower and the droplet of nectar that can be enjoyed by picking off the flower and sucking it out of the basal end. The common name of Gilia (once a component of its scientific name) is pronounced "Jee-lee-uh", an Italian pronunciation, after its original namesake, Italian scientist and clergyman Filippo Luigi Gilii.

Distribution
Ipomopsis aggregata is native to western North America, growing mainly in mountains in the west-central to western regions and ranging from British Columbia to Mexico.

Ecology
Ipomopsis aggregata is pollinated most commonly by long-tongued moths and hummingbirds, although others can be seen. Basal leaves overwinter, even in subalpine areas of the Rocky Mountains. The plant blooms in late spring to early summer, and into fall if weather conditions are favorable. Optimal growing conditions include little water, part shade, and sandy soil. Although defined as hermaphroditic, Ipomopsis aggregata has shown sex allocation in flowering months, with phenotypic sex  reaching a proportion of 0.77 female components to male.

Current research
The plant is currently being used to better understand pollination factors. Researchers used fluorescent particles on flowers to create pollen analogs to track pollinating hummingbirds. This ultimately gains insight into cross pollination techniques carried out by pollinating bodies. Further, it is a model for pollinator-mediated selection and spatial genetic patterns.

Uses 
Some Plateau Indian tribes boiled it as a drink for kidney health.

References

External links

Jepson Manual Treatment
California Academy of Sciences: Scarlet Gilia
Ipomopsis aggregata Wildflower Identification Page%5D edu/cgi/img_query?query_src=photos_index&where-taxon=Ipomopsis+aggregata Photo gallery
Ipomopsis aggregata Wildflower Identification Page, Photos

aggregata
Flora of North America